Are You There God? It's Me, Margaret is an upcoming American coming-of-age comedy drama film written for the screen and directed by Kelly Fremon Craig, based on the 1970 novel of the same name by Judy Blume. It stars Abby Ryder Fortson as the title character of Margaret Simon and Rachel McAdams as her mother Barbara.

Are You There God? It's Me, Margaret is scheduled to be released in the United States on April 28, 2023, by Lionsgate.

Premise
Sixth-grader Margaret Simon and her family move from New York City to the suburbs of New Jersey. Since one of her parents is Christian while the other is Jewish, she goes on a quest to discover her religious identity.

Cast
 Abby Ryder Fortson as Margaret Simon
 Rachel McAdams as Barbara Simon
 Benny Safdie as Herb Simon
 Kathy Bates as Sylvia Simon

Production
After rejecting several offers to adapt her book in the 49 years since its publication, author Judy Blume sold the film rights to James L. Brooks and Kelly Fremon Craig, who worked together on The Edge of Seventeen, with Craig set to write and direct. A studio bidding war over the distribution rights was won by Lionsgate.

In February 2021, it was announced that Abby Ryder Fortson would star as the titular Margaret, with Rachel McAdams cast as her mother. Kathy Bates was added to the cast in March. In April, Benny Safdie joined the cast.

Principal photography began on April 1, 2021, in Charlotte, North Carolina. Filming also took place in Concord, North Carolina late in May, and wrapped in June 2021.  Hans Zimmer composed the film's score.

Release
The film is scheduled for release on April 28, 2023 by Lionsgate. It was originally scheduled to be released on September 16, 2022.

References

External links
 
 

2023 comedy-drama films
2020s coming-of-age comedy-drama films
2020s English-language films
American coming-of-age comedy-drama films
Films about puberty
Films based on American novels
Films based on young adult literature
Films produced by James L. Brooks
Films with screenplays by Kelly Fremon Craig
Gracie Films films
Lionsgate films
Films set in New Jersey
Films shot in North Carolina
Upcoming English-language films
2020s American films